Tamil Nadu Cement Corporation Limited (TANCEM) is a state-government undertaking of Government of Tamil Nadu located in the Indian state of Tamil Nadu. It manufactures cement, AC sheets, hollow blocks, concrete and other building materials.

History
 Tamil Nadu Cement Corporation Limited (TANCEM) was incorporated on  1 April 1976 to take over and operate the existing cement plant in Alangulam, Virudhunagar  with an authorized share capital of Rs. 18 crores. 
In February 2021, indeed reported that Tamil Nadu Cement Corporation Limited (TANCEM) is employing about 300 employees

TANCEM Products
Tamil Nadu Cement Corporation Limited (TANCEM) has four vertical business:

 Cements – It manufacture and supply "ARASU"  branded  "Arasu Cements" O.P.C Cements (Grade 43 and 53) and "ARASU Super Star" branded P.P.C cement
 Asbestos Sheet – It manufacture and supply "ARASU"  branded  "Arasu A.C Sheets" Asbestos Sheet
 Stoneware Pipes – It manufacture and supply "ARASU"  branded  "Arasu S.W Pipes"

TANCEM Operation

Cements Plants
Tamil Nadu Cement Corporation Limited (TANCEM) has 2 cement plants: Alangulam Cement Works and Ariyalur Cement Works.

Alangulam Cement Works:
 Location – Alangulam, Virudhunagar, Virudhunagar District
 Commencement – 1970 – 71
 Products – ARASU brand 43 Grade OPC/PPC Cements, Portland Pozzalana Cement (PPC), Ordinary Portland Cement (OPC) [43 Grade]

Ariyalur Cement Works :
 Location – Ariyalur
 Commencement – 1979
 Capacity – 5 lakhs tonnes per annum

Asbestos Sheet Plants
Alangulam Asbestos Sheet Plant:
 Location – Alangulam, Virudhunagar, Virudhunagar District
 Commencement – October 1981
 Products – ARASU brand AC Sheets
 Capacity – 36000 tonnes per annum

Stoneware Pipes Plants
 Location – Vridhachalaam, Cuddalore District
 Commencement – 1962
 Capacity – 600 MTs per month

References

External links 
TANCEM – Official Website

Manufacturing companies based in Chennai
Cement companies of India
Manufacturing companies established in 1978
Government-owned companies of India
Indian companies established in 1978
1978 establishments in Tamil Nadu